The King of Rome was the ancient monarch of the Roman Kingdom

King of the Romans, the medieval title under the Holy Roman Empire
Napoleon II King of Rome, Napoleon I's son and heir
The King of Rome, racing pigeon 1913, and the song about it 
"King of Rome", The Unthanks with Brighouse and Rastrick Brass Band
"King of Rome", from Yes (Pet Shop Boys album)